This is a list of captains and coaches of AFL Women's premiership teams. No coach has yet led their team to more than one premiership, while Chelsea Randall and Erin Phillips are dual premiership captains.

See also

List of VFL/AFL premiership captains and coaches
List of NRL Women's captains and coaches

References

External links

Australian rules football records and statistics
 
captains